Seibertsbach is a river of Bavaria, Germany. It flows into the Wondreb near Mitterteich.

See also
List of rivers of Bavaria

Rivers of Bavaria
Rivers of Germany